Henri Heeren (born 25 October 1974) is a Dutch former football player.

Honours
Roda JC
KNVB Cup: 1996–97

References

External links
 

1974 births
Living people
Dutch footballers
Roda JC Kerkrade players
Alemannia Aachen players
1. FC Saarbrücken players
Fortuna Düsseldorf players
2. Bundesliga players
3. Liga players
Sportspeople from Heerlen
Association football midfielders
Footballers from Limburg (Netherlands)
Dutch expatriate sportspeople in Germany
Dutch expatriate footballers
Expatriate footballers in Germany